Sunrayce 93 was a solar car race across the United States, traveling from Arlington, Texas, to Minneapolis, Minnesota.  It took place June 20–26, 1993 and featured 34 university teams.  In the race, teams from colleges and universities throughout North America designed, built, tested, and raced solar-powered vehicles in a long distance road rally-style event. The first place car was Maize & Blue from the University of Michigan, winning their second championship.

Route
Day 1: Sun, June 20: Start in Dallas, Texas; must reach Whitesboro, TX checkpoint; finish in Ada, Oklahoma.
Day 2: Mon, June 21: Start in Ada, OK; must reach Shawnee, OK checkpoint; finish in Tulsa, OK.
Day 3: Tue, June 22: Start in Tulsa, OK; must reach Miami, OK checkpoint; finish in Fort Scott, Kansas.
Day 4: Wed, June 23: Start in Fort Scott, KS; must reach Kansas City, Missouri checkpoint; finish in Cameron, MO.
Day 5: Thu, June 24: Start in Cameron, MO; must reach Lineville, Iowa checkpoint; finish in Des Moines, IA.
Day 6: Fri, June 25: Start in Des Moines, IA; must reach Iowa Falls, IA checkpoint; finish in Albert Lea, Minnesota.
Day 7: Sat, June 26: Start in Albert Lea, MN; finish in Minneapolis, MN.

Overall standings

References

Solar car races